Pa Sak is a tambon (subdistrict) of Phu Sang District, in Phayao Province, Thailand. In 2019 it had a total population of 4,211 people.

History
The subdistrict was created effective August 1, 1995 by splitting off 7 administrative villages from Phu Sang.

Administration

Central administration
The tambon is subdivided into 10 administrative villages (muban).

Local administration
The whole area of the subdistrict is covered by the subdistrict administrative organization (SAO) Pa Sak (องค์การบริหารส่วนตำบลป่าสัก).

References

External links
Thaitambon.com on Pa Sak

Tambon of Phayao province
Populated places in Phayao province